Noise is the nineteenth studio album by Japanese rock band Boris. The Japanese edition of the album was released on 18 June 2014 via Avex Group's sub-label Tearbridge Records and consists of the original album plus other songs previously released on other endeavors, such as "Kimi no Yukue" which was used for a promotional video for the Chunsoft video game Zero Escape: Virtue's Last Reward in Japan. This is the second Boris album released through a major label (the first one being 2011's New Album, also released by Avex Group/Tearbridge). It was released on 17 June 2014 through Sargent House record label internationally on both CD and double vinyl.  A Japanese double vinyl edition was released by Daymare Recordings (without the bonus tracks on the Avex version).

The release date and the covers of the album were announced on April 8, 2014. Along with the announcement, an edit of the track "Quicksilver" was also released for streaming. The band embarked on a North American tour in 2014 in support of the album.

A studio re-recording of "Heavy Rain" appears on their collaborative album with Merzbow, Gensho; its deluxe CD version also features collaborative live performances of this song, "Melody," and "Angel."

Background
The band began working on the album in early 2013. In the press release, the band stated:

Track listing

Personnel
 Atsuo
 Wata
 Takeshi

References

2014 albums
Boris (band) albums
Avex Group albums
Sargent House albums